Krombia is a genus of moths of the family Crambidae.

Species
Krombia belutschistanalis Amsel, 1961
Krombia djergiralis Chrétien, 1911
Krombia harralis Chrétien, 1911
Krombia minimella Amsel, 1961
Krombia pulchella Amsel, 1949
Krombia venturalis Luquet & Minet, 1982
Krombia zarcinella D. Lucas, 1909

References

Cybalomiinae
Crambidae genera